Ettore Romoli (9 April 1938 – 14 June 2018) was an Italian politician. He was a member of the Forza Italia party and was mayor of Gorizia from 2007 to 2017.

References 

1938 births
2018 deaths
People from Gorizia
Forza Italia politicians
20th-century Italian politicians
21st-century Italian politicians
Mayors of places in Friuli-Venezia Giulia
Senators of Legislature XII of Italy
Deputies of Legislature XIV of Italy